Hyalinobatrachium fragile is a species of frog in the family Centrolenidae. It is endemic to the Venezuelan Coastal Range. In Spanish it is known as ranita de cristal fragil.

Its natural habitats are montane forests, where it occurs along streams. It is threatened by habitat loss caused by agriculture and logging as well as landslides.

References

fragile
Amphibians described in 1985
Amphibians of Venezuela
Endemic fauna of Venezuela
Taxa named by Juan A. Rivero
Taxonomy articles created by Polbot